Mass is the third and last full-length album by the experimental band Grotus. The album's sound focuses more on alternative and blues rock than industrial and is perhaps their most accessible recording. The band broke up the same year the album was released.

Critical reception
The St. Louis Post-Dispatch called the album "snot-nosed, sludgehammer rock that comes off like a minor league Wax Trax act," writing that "it flashes with brilliant bits, such as 'Taint Nobody's Bizness If I Do,' which sports out-of-tune piano pounding augmented by sequences and raunchy talk-show samples." Ox-Fanzine called it "just plain boring, a pounding piece of pseudo-experimental alternative rumble."

Track listing
 "That's Entertainment" - 2:32
 "A Bad Itch" - 3:20
 "White Trash Blues" - 3:56
 "Ebola Reston" - 4:12
 "Hand to Mouth" - 2:57
 "T'Ain't Nobody's Bizness If I Do" - 4:04
 "Sick" - 3:04
 "Collect 'Em All" - 4:25
 "Wild Bill" - 3:30
 "The Bottom Line" - 3:31
 "Back in the Day" - 4:10

Personnel

Grotus
Bruce Boyd - drums, turntables
John Carson - bass, sampler, electronics, synthesizer
Lars Fox - vocals, drums, sampling
Adam Tanner - Fender bass, string bass, guitar, sampling, electronics

Production
Chris Arvan - production, engineering

References

1996 albums
Grotus albums
London Records albums